Joshua Myles Abraham Key is an English professional footballer who plays as a defender for  club Exeter City.

Career
Key started his career at Torquay United while attending St Cuthbert Mayne School in Torquay, but joined local rivals Exeter City after the Gulls were forced to close their youth academy as part of cost-cutting measures. The winger was part of a successful Grecians youth setup, winning the Youth Alliance South West Division as part of Exeter's under-18 side. Key joined Bideford on a three-month loan deal in February 2018, making his debut in against Tiverton Town on 7 February. He earned praise from manager Sean Joyce for his performances for the Robins, and was offered a senior contract by Exeter for the following season.

In July 2018, Key (alongside teammate Joel Randall) joined Southern League Premier Division South side Tiverton Town on an initial six-month loan deal. Key made his professional debut for Exeter in November 2018 during Exeter's EFL Trophy tie against Bristol Rovers, coming on as a substitute for Chiedozie Ogbene in the 60th minute. He scored his first goal for the club in an EFL Trophy tie against Forest Green Rovers on 8 September 2020. He then scored his first League Two goal in Exeter's 2–1 win at Mansfield Town on 26 September 2020.

Career statistics

Honours
Exeter City
League Two runner-up: 2021–22

References

External links
Joshua Key player profile at Exeter City

1999 births
Living people
English footballers
Association football midfielders
Exeter City F.C. players
Bideford A.F.C. players
Tiverton Town F.C. players